Survivor: Samoa is the nineteenth season of the American CBS competitive reality television series Survivor. The season premiered on Thursday, September 17, 2009. Participant applications were due by January 14, 2009. Approximately 800 were invited to be interviewed in several states. Following this, approximately 48 semi-finalists were invited to Los Angeles in April 2009 for final interviews with the producers. From there, 20 finalists were selected to be contestants in the show, which was scheduled to occur between mid June and mid-July 2009 in Samoa. Similar to Survivor: Tocantins, the minimum age requirement for this season was 18 for most states.

In the end, Natalie White defeated Russell Hantz and Mick Trimming with a vote of 7–2–0. Hantz ended up winning the "Sprint Player of the Season" Award, earning the fans' vote over the next highest vote getters, Shannon "Shambo" Waters and Brett Clouser. This was the first season when the tribes merged at 12 players with nine people on the jury.

Contestants
The 20 contestants were initially split into two teams of ten: Foa Foa and Galu, both meaning "trumpet shell" and "wave" in Samoan respectively. On day 19, the merged tribe Aiga means "family" in Samoan which was first suggested by contestant Erik Cardona. Mike Borassi was originally cast for the previous season Survivor: Tocantins, but had to pull out due to having high blood pressure.

Future appearances
Russell Hantz later competed on Survivor: Heroes vs. Villains, Survivor: Redemption Island, and Australian Survivor: Champions vs. Contenders. Russell Swan competed on Survivor: Philippines. Laura Morett competed on Survivor: Blood vs. Water alongside her daughter Ciera Eastin. Monica Padilla returned for Survivor: Cambodia. John Fincher later married Survivor: Micronesia winner Parvati Shallow and appeared on Survivor: Winners at War as part of the loved ones visit.

Season summary
The 20 contestants were assigned tribes at the start of the game and, based only on appearances, were instructed to elect a leader who would make critical decisions at challenges for the first half of the game. The leader of the tribe that won the reward challenge would also choose a member of their tribe to observe the other tribe for a day, receiving a clue to the hidden immunity idol at the other tribe's camp. Mick was chosen as Foa Foa's leader, and Russell S. as Galu's.

At Foa Foa, Russell H. attempted to make living conditions harsher for his tribe by dumping water out of canteens and burning socks, leading to Foa Foa losing nearly every challenge. Russell H. managed to find his tribe's hidden immunity idol at his own camp and, after making alliances with virtually all of his tribe mates, amassed a huge amount of influence among the members of his tribe. Galu's winning streak led to a relaxed state at the camp, a condition that Shambo resented, putting her at odds with the tribe. After Galu won a reward challenge, Russell S. opted to send Shambo over to Foa Foa for one night, where she found the tribe had a strong work ethic and welcomed her. Russell S. was removed from the game due to fatigue, and Galu elected Shambo as their new leader in order to gain her loyalty.

The two tribes merged with twelve players left: four from Foa Foa and eight from Galu. Natalie from Foa Foa was able to convince the Galu women to vote off one of their own, Erik. At this vote, Russell H. had played his hidden immunity idol, but it was all for naught as Erik was eliminated. Russell H. managed to find the idol in its new location before the next tribal council. He played his new idol there, saving himself from being voted off as he was targeted by every Galu member.  With ten players remaining, Shambo decided to align with the Foa Foa alliance, which led to a 5-5 tie. John from the Galu alliance, paranoid that he would get eliminated from the game by a random rock draw, switched his vote on the tiebreaker to send off a Galu.  This put the Foa Foa alliance in the majority.  Foa Foa systematically eliminated the former Galu members.  However, their plans were halted when Brett (the final member of the Galu alliance) won three immunity challenges in a row. Perceived as physically drained, and unlikely to beat Brett in the coming immunity challenges, Shambo and Jaison were voted out. With four players remaining, Russell H. ended Brett's immunity streak in the final four immunity contest.  Brett was the final player voted out.

Russell H., Mick, and Natalie were the final three. At the Final Tribal Council, Mick was ignored by the jury, given his lack of leadership when assigned that role and his seemingly lackluster enthusiasm for the game. Though Russell H. felt confident that Natalie would be viewed by the jury as a coattail rider while he would be seen as a topnotch player, the jury lambasted his poor social connections, whilst Natalie was praised for her quieter, adaptive gameplay. Natalie was ultimately named the Sole Survivor over Russell H. and Mick by a vote of 7–2–0.

In the case of multiple tribes or castaways who win reward or immunity, they are listed in order of finish, or alphabetically where it was a team effort; where one castaway won and invited others, the invitees are in brackets.

Episodes

Voting history

Reception
Survivor: Samoa has received wildly polarizing opinions from both fans and critics. The primary criticism is aimed at the perceived overexposure of contestant Russell Hantz. Critics believe this was done to an extent that it rendered many of the other contestants, including winner Natalie White, unmemorable due to their lack of screen time. However, not all opinions of the season were negative. The gameplay of Hantz, which was seen as very unorthodox compared to other Survivor players, garnered high praise from fans, allowing him to win the Fan Favorite Award for the season. Hantz's cutthroat attitude and ability to find hidden immunity idols without a clue propelled him into becoming one of the most infamous villains in the show's history. Dalton Ross of Entertainment Weekly ranked this season 15th out of 40. In 2015, a poll by Rob Has a Podcast ranked this season 15th out of 30, with Rob Cesternino ranking this season 8th. This was updated in 2021 during Cesternino's podcast, Survivor All-Time Top 40 Rankings, ranking 25th out of 40. The Purple Rock Survivor Podcast listed Samoa as the twenty-second best season out of 40. They claim the season is, "incredibly divisive, and understandably so. It is impossible to think of this season without thinking of one specific player, and your feelings about that player will likely determine how you rate this season." Inside Survivor listed the season as the twenty-sixth best out of 40, claiming that, "if Survivor was going to continue into its second decade, it needed a kick up the ass—something to revitalize the format and push it forward into a new generation. Survivor: Samoa was the start of that, in large part thanks to a trilby-wearing oil company owner named Russell Hantz." In 2014, The Wire ranked the season as the third-worst of the series (only ahead of Gabon and Redemption Island).

References

External links
 Official CBS Survivor: Samoa Website

2009 in Samoa
19
2009 American television seasons
Television shows filmed in Samoa